Ville-sur-Saulx (literally Ville on Saulx) is a commune in the Meuse department in Grand Est in north-eastern France.

See also
Communes of the Meuse department

References

Villesursaulx